Gandhāra was an ancient Indo-Aryan kingdom of northwestern Indian subcontinent whose existence is attested during the Iron Age. The inhabitants of Gandhāra were called the Gāndhārīs.

Location 

The Gandhāra kingdom of the late Vedic period was located on both sides of the Indus river, and it corresponded to the modern Rawalpindi District of modern-day Pakistani Punjab and Peshawar District of Khyber Pakhtunkhwa. By the 6th century BCE, Gandhāra had expanded to include the valley of Kaśmīra.

The capital of Gandhāra was Takṣaśila, and its other major town was Puṣkalāvatī or Puṣkarāvatī.

History

Kingdom 

The Gāndhārī king Nagnajit and his son Svarajit are mentioned in the s, according to which they received Brahmanic consecration, but their family's attitude towards ritual is mentioned negatively, with the royal family of Gandhāra during this period following non-Brahmanical religious traditions. According to the Jain , Nagnajit, or Naggaji, was a prominent king who had adopted Jainism and was comparable to Dvimukha of Pāñcāla, Nimi of Videha, Karakaṇḍu of Kaliṅga, and Bhīma of Vidarbha; Buddhist sources instead claim that he had achieved .

By the later Vedic period, the situation had changed, and the Gāndhārī capital of Takṣaśila had become an important centre of knowledge where the men of  went to learn the three Vedas and the eighteen branches of knowledge, with the  recording that s went north to study.

During the 6th century BCE, Gandhāra was an important imperial power in north-west Iron Age South Asia, with the valley of Kaśmīra being part of the kingdom, while the other states of the Punjab region, such as the Kekayas, Madrakas, Uśīnaras, and Shivis being under Gāndhārī suzerainty. The Gāndhārī king Pukkusāti, who reigned around 550 BCE, engaged in expansionist ventures which brought him into conflict with the king Pradyota of the rising power of Avanti. Pukkusāti was successful in this struggle with Pradyota, but war broke out between him and the Pāṇḍava tribe located in the Punjab region, and who were threatened by his expansionist policy. Pukkusāti also engaged in friendly relations with the king Bimbisāra of Magadha.

Due to this important position, Buddhist texts listed the Gandhāra kingdom as one of the sixteen s ("great realms") of Iron Age South Asia.

Conquest by Persia 

By the later 6th century BCE, the founder of the Persian Achaemenid Empire, Cyrus, soon after his conquests of Media, Lydia, and Babylonia, marched into Gandhara and annexed it into his empire. The scholar Kaikhosru Danjibuoy Sethna advanced that Cyrus had conquered only the trans-Indus borderlands around Peshawar which had belonged to Gandhāra while Pukkusāti remained a powerful king who maintained his rule over the rest of Gandhāra and the western Punjab.

However, according to the scholar Buddha Prakash, Pukkusāti might have acted as a bulwark against the expansion of the Persian Achaemenid Empire into north-west South Asia. This hypothesis posits that the army which Nearchus claimed Cyrus had lost in Gedrosia had in fact been defeated by Pukkusāti's Gāndhārī kingdom.

It is unknown whether Pukkusāti remained in power after the Achaemenid conquest as a Persian vassal or if he was replaced by a Persian satrap (governor), although Buddhist sources claim that he renounced his throne and became a monk after becoming a disciple of the Buddha. The annexation under Cyrus was limited to Gandhāra proper, after which the peoples of the Punjab region previously under Gāndhārī authority took advantage of the new power vacuum to form their own states.

See also 
 Gandhara
 Janapada
 Mahajanapada
 Gandhara Kingdom
 Gandhara grave culture
 Sindhu-Sauvīra

References

Further reading 

Mahajanapadas
Archaeology of Afghanistan
Ancient peoples of Pakistan
Iron Age Asia